Time to Fall is the second solo (studio) album by Karen Matheson, lead singer of the Scottish band Capercaillie.

Track listing
 "All the Flowers of the Bough" – 4:31
 "Morning" – 4:40
 "Time to Fall" – 4:08
 "My Whispered Reason" – 2:11
 "Bonnie Jean" - 5:10
 "Goodbye Phoebe" – 3:21
 "An Ataireachd Ard (The Surge of the Sea)" – 5:17
 "Speed of Love" – 5:02
 "Moonchild" – 3:48
 "Moch Di Luain" – 2:53
 "Hoping for You" - 3:02
 "World Stood Still" - 4:17

Personnel
 James Grant - acoustic guitar, electric guitar, backing vocals
 Bobby Henry - backing vocals, electric guitar 
 Ewen Vernal - double bass
 Quee MacArthur - bass
 James Mackintosh - drums, percussion
 Paul McGeechan - keyboards
 Tim O'Brien - vocals (track 12)
 Bobby Paterson - bass
 Donald Shaw - Wurlitzer piano, piano, synthesizer, accordion 
 Neil Yates - trumpet
 BT Scottish Ensemble - strings

References

Karen Matheson albums
2002 albums